Mollington railway station was on the Chester and Birkenhead Railway near to the village of Mollington in Cheshire, England. The station opened on 23 September 1840 at the same time as the railway line and closed to passengers on 7 March 1960 due to its remote location and fairly low passenger numbers. It remained open for goods traffic until 4 January 1965, but only as an unstaffed public siding. The station building still exists as a private house and the line is now operated by Merseyrail as part of the Wirral Line.

Services

References

Further reading

External links
Mollington railway station on Disused Stations

Disused railway stations in Cheshire
Former Birkenhead Railway stations
Railway stations in Great Britain opened in 1840
Railway stations in Great Britain closed in 1960